Ten Rounds is the thirteenth studio album by country artist Eddie Rabbitt, released in 1991 by Capitol Records. The album produced one single, "Hang Up the Phone", which was the last charting single of his career. The track "747" had previously appeared on Rabbitt's 1980 album Horizon.

Rabbitt wrote the song "C-Rap (Country Rap)" in response to his dissatisfaction with rap music.

Track listing
All tracks written by Eddie Rabbitt; "You Look Like an Angel" and "I'll Get Along Without You Just Fine" co-written by Reed Nielsen.
"747" – 3:08
"You Look Like an Angel" – 3:28
"I'll Get Along Without You Just Fine" – 3:27
"Hang Up the Phone" – 3:09
"Sorry That I'm Sorry Again" – 2:35
"C-Rap (Country Rap)" – 3:03
"You Are Everything to Me" – 3:35
"Destiny" – 4:09
"Will We Ever Love Again" – 4:09
"Wish I Had Somebody to Love" – 4:33

Personnel
Compiled from liner notes.

Musicians
 David Briggs – piano, synthesizer
 Glen Duncan – fiddle
 Paul Franklin – steel guitar
 Steve Gibson – electric guitar
 David Hungate – bass guitar
 Richard Landis – organ
 Paul Leim – drums, drum programming
 Brent Mason – electric guitar
 Terry McMillan – harmonica, percussion
 Joey Miskulin – accordion
 Eddie Rabbitt – lead vocals, background vocals, acoustic guitar
 Billy Joe Walker, Jr. – acoustic guitar

Technical
 Jim Cotton – digital recording, mixing
 Richard Landis – producer
 Joe Scaife – mixing
 Hank Williams – mastering

Charts

References

1991 albums
Eddie Rabbitt albums
Capitol Records albums
Albums produced by Richard Landis